Lamb or The Lamb may refer to:
 A young sheep
 Lamb and mutton, the meat of sheep

Arts and media

Film, television, and theatre
 The Lamb (1915 film), a silent film starring Douglas Fairbanks Sr. in his screen debut
 The Lamb (1918 film), a silent short comedy starring Harold Lloyd
 The Lamb (2014 film), a 2014 Turkish-German film
 The Lamb (2017 film), a 2017 American animated film
 Lamb (1985 film), a 1985 drama starring Liam Neeson
 Lamb (2015 American film), a 2015 American film by Ross Partridge
 Lamb (2015 Ethiopian film), a 2015 Ethiopian film
 Lamb (2021 film), a supernatural drama film starring Noomi Rapace
 LaMB, a 2009 animated telefilm
 The Lambs, an American theatrical organization
 The Lamb, an uncompleted film project by Garth Brooks about the fictional musician Chris Gaines
 "Lambs", an episode of the television series Teletubbies

Literature
 The Lamb (poem), a 1789 poem by William Blake
 Lamb: The Gospel According to Biff, Christ's Childhood Pal, a 2002 novel by Christopher Moore
 Lamb, a 1980 novel by Bernard MacLaverty

Music
 Cainon Lamb (1978–), American record producer, known professionally as "Lamb" or "Lambo"
 Lamb (rock band), a 1969–1973 American rock band
 Lamb (electronic band), an English electronic music duo
 Lamb (album), their self titled debut album from 1996
 The Lamb (Tavener), a 1982 choral work by John Tavener
 The Lamb Lies Down on Broadway or just The Lamb, a 1974 album by Genesis
 Love. Angel. Music. Baby., a 2004 album by Gwen Stefani
 "The Lamb", a song by Aphrodite's Child from 666
 Edgar Sampson (1907–1973), American composer, saxophonist, and violinist, nicknamed "The Lamb"

Places 
 Lamb (island), East Lothian, an island in the Firth of Forth, Scotland
 The Lamb, Bloomsbury, a pub in Bloomsbury, London, England
 The Lamb Ground, a football stadium and home of Tamworth F.C., England
 Lamb, Indiana, a community in the United States
 Lamb, Missouri, a ghost town in the United States
 Lamb County, Texas, a county in the United States

Products 
 L.A.M.B., a fashion line by American singer Gwen Stefani
 Lamb's, a brand of rum

Religion
 Lamb (liturgy), in the Orthodox Church, a cube of bread offered at the Divine Liturgy
 Lamb of God, a metaphorical reference to Jesus Christ

Science 
 Lamb (crater), a lunar crater
 Lamb., the botanical author abbreviation of Aylmer Bourke Lambert
 LamB porin or Maltoporin, a membrane protein of gram-negative bacteria
 LAMB syndrome or Carney complex, a medical condition

Other uses
 Lamb (surname), a list of people with the last name
 Auto-Moto Society of Latvia (LAMB), an FIA member organization
 Light Armoured Motor Battery (LAMB), a unit of the British Army's Machine Gun Corps
 The Lamb, a British racehorse; winner of the Grand National in 1868 and 1871

See also
 
 Iamb (disambiguation)
 Lamb of God (disambiguation)
 Lahm, a surname
 Lam (disambiguation)
 Lamba (disambiguation)
 Lambo (disambiguation)
 Lamm, a surname